

Ottoman Empire
 Principality of Abkhazia – Arslan Begi (1806–1810)

Portugal
 Angola – 
 Temporarily vacant (1806–1807)
 António de Saldanha da Gama, Governor of Angola (1807–1810)
 Macau – Bernardo Aleixo de Lemos e Faria, Governor of Macau (1806–1808)

Spanish Empire
Viceroyalty of New Granada – Antonio José Amar y Borbón Arguedas, Viceroy of New Granada (1803–1810)
Viceroyalty of New Spain – José Joaquín Vicente de Iturrigaray y Aróstegui, Viceroy of New Spain (1803–1808)
Captaincy General of Cuba – Salvador José de Muro, 2nd Marquis of Someruelos, Governor of Cuba (1799–1812)
Spanish East Indies – Mariano Fernández de Folgueras, Governor-General of the Philippines (1806–1810)
Commandancy General of the Provincias Internas – Nemesio Salcedo y Salcedo (1802–1813)
Viceroyalty of Peru – José Fernando Abascal y Sousa, marqués de la Concordia, Viceroy of Peru (1806–1816)
Captaincy General of Chile – Luis Muñoz de Guzmán, Governor and Captain-General of Chile (1802–1808)
Viceroyalty of the Río de la Plata – 
Rafael de Sobremonte, Viceroy of the Río de la Plata (1804–1807)
Santiago de Liniers, Viceroy of the Río de la Plata (1807–1809)

United Kingdom
 Cayman Islands – William Bodden, Chief Magistrate of the Cayman Islands (1776–1823)
 Malta Protectorate – Alexander Ball, Civil Commissioner of Malta (1802–1809)
 New South Wales – William Bligh, Governor of New South Wales (1806–1808)

Colonial governors
Colonial governors
1807